Kenneth Arthur McDonald (1928-2015), was a male weightlifter who competed for England.

Weightlifting career
He represented Australia at the 1952 Summer Olympics finishing in sixth place in the middle-heavyweight category.

He represented England and won a gold medal in the -110 Kg combined category at the 1958 British Empire and Commonwealth Games in Cardiff, Wales.

He was a member of the YMCA Club in central London from 1950 until 1980.

References

1928 births
2015 deaths
English male weightlifters
Australian male weightlifters
Commonwealth Games medallists in weightlifting
Commonwealth Games gold medallists for England
Weightlifters at the 1958 British Empire and Commonwealth Games
Olympic weightlifters of Australia
Weightlifters at the 1952 Summer Olympics
Medallists at the 1958 British Empire and Commonwealth Games